In statistical mechanics, the cluster expansion (also called the high temperature expansion or hopping expansion) is a power series expansion of the partition function of a statistical field theory around a model that is a union of non-interacting 0-dimensional field theories. Unlike the usual perturbation expansion which usually leads to a divergent asymptotic series, the cluster expansion may converge within a non-trivial region, in particular when the interaction is small and short-ranged.

Classical case

General theory
In statistical mechanics, the properties of a system of noninteracting particles are described using the
partition function. For N noninteracting particles, the system is described by the Hamiltonian 
,
and the partition function can be calculated (for the classical case) as

From the partition function, one can calculate the Helmholtz free energy  and, from  that, all the thermodynamic properties of the system, like the entropy, the internal energy, the chemical potential, etc.

When the particles of the system interact, an exact calculation of the partition function is usually not possible. For low density, the interactions can be approximated with 
a sum of two-particle potentials:

For this interaction potential, the partition function can be written as

 ,
and the free energy is
 ,
where Q is the configuration integral:

Calculation of the configuration integral
The configuration integral  cannot  be calculated analytically for a general pair potential
. One way to calculate the potential approximately is to use the Mayer cluster expansion. This expansion is based on the observation that the exponential in the equation for  can be written as a product of the form
.
After substitution, the equation for the configuration integral becomes:

 
The calculation of the product in the above equation leads into a series of terms; the first is equal to one, the second term is equal to the sum over i and j of the terms , and the process continues until all the higher order terms are calculated. 

Each term must appear only once. With this expansion it is possible to find terms of different order, in terms of the number of particles that are involved. The first term is the non-interaction term (corresponding to no interactions amongst particles), the second term corresponds to the two-particle interactions, the third to the two-particle interactions amongst 4 (not necessarily distinct) particles, and so on. This physical interpretation is the reason this expansion is called the cluster expansion: the sum can be rearranged so that each term represents the interactions within clusters of a certain number of particles.

Substituting the expansion of the product back into the expression for the configuration integral results in a series expansion for :

 
Substituting in the equation for the free energy, it is possible to derive
the equation of state for the system of interacting particles. The equation will have the form
,
which is known as the virial equation, and the components  are the virial coefficients.
Each of the virial coefficients corresponds to one term from the cluster expansion ( is the two-particle interaction term,  is the three-particle interaction term and so on).
Keeping only the two-particle interaction term, it can be shown that the cluster expansion, with some approximations, gives the Van der Waals equation.

This can be applied further to mixtures of gases and liquid solutions.

References

 , chapter 9.
 
 
 

Statistical mechanics